Ntare I Kivimira Savuyimba Semunganzashamba Rushatsi Cambarantama was the king of Burundi from 1680 to 1709. He was a legendary descendant of the Ntwero family, and the first king of Burundi. 

Ntare established the Sentare, a tribunal of judges to handle property disputes between chiefs.

References

Works cited 
 

Burundian kings
17th-century monarchs in Africa
18th-century monarchs in Africa